Belkovsky Island is the westernmost island of the Anzhu Islands subgroup of the New Siberian Islands archipelago in the Laptev Sea.

Location
The strait between Belkovsky Island and neighboring Kotelny Island is known as the Zarya Strait, after Eduard Toll's Zarya (polar ship). Ostrov Strizhëva is a small islet located right off Belkovsky's southern shore.

Belkovsky Island is approximately 500 km² in area. The highest point of the island is 120 m.

Administratively, Belkovsky Island is a part of Yakutia, Russian Federation.

Geology
Belkovsky Island consist of tightly folded Upper Devonian and Lower Carboniferous strata. The Upper Devonian rocks are clayey marine carbonates interbedded with limestone, sandstone, and conglomerate. The Lower Carboniferous rocks are composed of siltstone, argillite, and sandstone interbedded with breccia, limestone, and infrequent rhyolitic lavas.

Fauna and Flora
There are big bird colonies and a walrus rookery on the island.

Rush/grass, forb, cryptogam tundra covers the Belkovsky Island. It is tundra consisting mostly of very low-growing grasses, rushes, forbs, mosses, lichens, and liverworts. These plants either mostly or completely cover the surface of the ground. The soils are typically moist, fine-grained, and often hummocky.

History
The island was discovered in 1808 by a Russian merchant named Belkov.

References

External links
anonymous, nd, Laptev Sea Alfred Wegener Institute for Polar and Marine Research - Research Unit Potsdam, Potsdam, Germany.

Rachold, V., nda, pebble beach of Belkovsky Island. Alfred Wegener Institute for Polar and Marine Research - Research Unit Potsdam, Potsdam, Germany.

Rachold, V., ndb, remnants of sea-ice, August 2002. Alfred Wegener Institute for Polar and Marine Research - Research Unit Potsdam, Potsdam, Germany.

Seabird colonies
Anzhu Islands
New Siberian Islands
Islands of the Sakha Republic